A Queen's Ransom, (Chinese: 鱷潭群英會) also known as International Assassin, is a 1976 Hong Kong action film about a plot to assassinate Queen Elizabeth II. The film was written and directed by Ting Shan-hsi and starred Jimmy Wang Yu, Angela Mao, George Lazenby, Ko Chun-hsiung, Charles Heung and Dean Shek, whom also serves as the film's assistant director.

Plot
During Queen Elizabeth II's visit to Hong Kong in 1975, a group of criminals plan her assassination.

Cast
 Jimmy Wang Yu as Jimmy Viet Cong Guerilla
 Angela Mao as Maria Cambodian Martial Artist & A Commy
 George Lazenby as Morgan
 Ko Chun-hsiung as Police chief Gao The Detective
 Charles Heung as Police detective Karate Master
 Dean Shek as Ducky
  as Jenny
 Chan Pei-shan as Miyamoto Japanese Red Army Triggerman
 Judith Brown as Black Rose
 Bolo Yeung as Ram Thai Bodybuilder.
 Hao Li-jen as Ducky's uncle
 Hon Yee-sang as Cambodian
 Cheung King-po as Bandit
 Wong Sam as Police department
 Peter Chan as Chen Lung
 Chu Tit-wo as Police detective
 Helen Poon as Gao's wife
 Wu Jiaxiang
 Luk Chuen as Princess' guard who fights with shark
 Ling Hon as Policeman
 Wan Leng-kwong as Policeman
 Dabid Chung as Noda
 Han Ying-chieh as Princess' guard with sword
 Yue Man-wa as Police detective
 Cheung Siu-lun
 Sze-ma Wah-lung
 Kong Chuen

Production
Taiwanese director Ting Shan-hsi was hired by Golden Harvest off the back of his successful film, Everlasting Glory (1974).

It was the last of three films George Lazenby made for Golden Harvest, the others being Stoner and The Man from Hong Kong.

References

External links
 
 A Queen's Ransom at The Spinning Image

1976 films
1970s action thriller films
1976 martial arts films
Hong Kong action thriller films
Hong Kong martial arts films
Police detective films
1970s Cantonese-language films
Golden Harvest films
Films set in Hong Kong
Films shot in Hong Kong
Films about Elizabeth II
Films about terrorism
Fiction about assassinations
Cultural depictions of Elizabeth II
Films directed by Ting Shan-hsi
1970s Hong Kong films